Chapman To (born 8 June 1972), born Edward Ng Cheuk-cheung, is a Hong Kong actor. He is best known for his roles in films such as Infernal Affairs and Initial D. He is also the founder of his own multimedia platform known as "Chapman To's Late Show". In 2022, To officially naturalised in Taiwan.

Career
To began his acting career in TV soap operas and moved to the big screen in 2000. He is best known for playing Tsui Wai-Keung in the Infernal Affairs trilogy, as well as the role of Itsuki Tachibana in Initial D. He married Kristal Tin in 2005. In 2006, he starred in Pang Ho-Cheung's film Isabella with Isabella Leong.

Along with acting, To was also a radio personality for Commercial Radio 2(CR2). He hosted the show, On a Clear Day (在晴朗的一天出發), a 2-hour morning show which was co-hosted by Michelle Lo and Jan Lamb. However, after a fall-out with the key personnel of the radio company, Chapman lost the radio hosting job in 2006.

To is also an avid amateur photographer.  In 2011, To was hired as the photographer for cantopop singer Prudence Liew's album Love Addict.  To stated that this is the first time he is paid for his photography work.

On 3 August 2018, he founded a multimedia platform called "Chapman To's Late Show". The channel mainly made fun of current issues in Hong Kong. It also made tutorials for smores and interviewed famous politicians and actors/singers from Hong Kong. Due to the platform's content being daring, down-to-earth and it's satirical way of presenting current issues, it was widely praised by Hong Kong's netizens. In 2020 Chapman To announced that the platform will be pulling out of YouTube and Facebook, and subsequently established a paid platform at lateshow.net, with subscription fee being HK$60 per month and VIP subscription HK$600 per year; the VIP members get access to special content such as his stand-up comedy live performance of 2020. Celebrities such as Anthony Wong and Gregory Wong have appeared for its shows.

Political positions and Chinese blacklist
In March 2014, To expressed support for the Sunflower Student Movement in Taiwan, which was skeptical of a proposed agreement to create closer ties between Taiwan and mainland China.

During Hong Kong's Umbrella Movement, he was involved in online arguments with some mainland netizens.

To criticised the Chinese government and proudly stated to netizens to "Stop me from coming to the mainland if you've got guts."
Chinese audiences reacted and To's first two movies after the incident, Let Go for Love and Aberdeen, flopped at the Chinese box office. The production companies apologised and regretted casting To.

Hong Kong directors such as Wong Jing subsequently refused to work with To, resulting in him being blacklisted in both the Chinese and Hong Kong movie market.

Exiled from the lucrative Chinese market, To focused on Malaysia and Singapore. Despite not having any Chinese investment, his films have achieved success in their target markets. To acted as director, writer, and actor for these low-budget films.

To moved to Taiwan in November 2020, and announced in February 2022 that he had attained Taiwanese citizenship.

Filmography

Television

Film 

Moonlight in Tokyo (2005) – Hoi
 Nominated - Golden Horse Award for Best Supporting Actor
 Wait 'Til You're Older (2005) – Policeman
 Initial D (2005) – Itsuki Tachibana
 Colour of the Loyalty (2005)
 Confession of Pain (2006) – Inspector Tsui Wing Kwong
 A Melody Looking (2006) – Chapman
 Isabella (2006) – Shing
 Nominated - Berlin International Film Festival Best Supporting Actor Award
 Trivial Matters (2007)
 Simply Actors (2007) – Crazy Sam
 Lady Cop & Papa Crook (2008)
 True Women for Sale (2008)
 Parking (2008)
 Home Run (2008)
 Rebellion (2009) – Blackie
 Ex (2010) Entered into the 2010 Hong Kong International Film Festival
 Once a Gangster (2010) (writer)
 Triple Tap (2010)
 La Comédie humaine (2010) Entered into the 2010 Hong Kong International Film Festival
 The Jade and the Pearl (2010) – Eunuch Yeung
 Legend of the Fist: The Return of Chen Zhen (2010) – Inspector Huang Haolong (voice)
 Who's the Hero (2010) (TV series)
 The Kidnap (2010)
 All's Well, Ends Well 2011 (2011)
 Mr. and Mrs. Incredible (2011)
 Eternal Moment (2011)
 Men Suddenly in Love (2011)
 Hi, Fidelity (2011)
 Love in Space (2011)
 A Simple Life (2011)
 The Sorcerer and the White Snake (2011)
 A Big Deal (2011)
 Turning Point 2 (2011)
 All's Well, Ends Well 2012 (2012)
 Mr. and Mrs. Gambler (2012)
 Marry a Perfect Man (2012)
 Love Lifting (2012)
 The Bounty (2012)
 Vulgaria (2012)
 Nominated - Hong Kong Film Award for Best Actor
 Nominated - Golden Horse Award for Best Actor
 Diva (2012)
 Hong Kong Film Critics Society Award for Best Actor
 Nominated - Hong Kong Film Award for Best Supporting Actor
 Nominated - Golden Horse Award for Best Supporting Actor
 Bring Happiness Home (2013)
 Hotel Deluxe (2013)
 The Wedding Diary 2 (2013)
 SDU: Sex Duties Unit (2013)
 The Midas Touch (2013)
 Mr. and Mrs. Player (2013)
 Hello Babies (2014)
 Golden Chicken 3 (2014)
 From Vegas to Macau (2014)
 Black Comedy (2014)
 Naked Ambition 2 (2014)
 Let Go for Love (2014)
 Aberdeen (2014)
 Flirting in the Air (2014)
 King of Mahjong (2015)
 Sara (2015) (as producer only)
 Impossible (2015)
 The Mobfathers (2015)
 Let's Eat! (2016)
 The Empty Hands (2017)
 G Affairs (2019)

References

External links
 Official Blog of Chapman To
 Chapman To on Sina Weibo
 
 
 Chapman To Man Chat at the Hong Kong Cinemagic
 Chapman To at LoveHKFilm

1972 births
Living people
Hong Kong Buddhists
Hong Kong Taoists
Hong Kong male television actors
Hong Kong radio presenters
Converts to Buddhism from Christianity
20th-century Hong Kong male actors
21st-century Hong Kong male actors
Hong Kong male film actors
Hong Kong expatriates in Malaysia
Naturalised citizens of Taiwan
Hong Kong emigrants to Taiwan